Ayşe Seitmuratova (born 11 February 1937) is a Crimean Tatar civil rights activist.

Biography
Born in Crimea shortly before the Surgun, she survived deportation as a child and lived for many years as a “special settler”, rendering her a second-class citizen. After academic opportunities that she overqualified for were denied to her because of the “special settler” designation that was applied to her only because of her ethnicity, she became an active member of the Crimean Tatar civil rights movement. After advocating for some of the most draconian restrictions on Crimean Tatar civil rights to be lifted and meeting with Soviet leadership, she continued to lobby Moscow for the right of return – something granted to most other deported nations, but not Crimean Tatars. Detained and imprisoned by Soviet authorities on multiple occasions, she threatened self-immolation in Red Square if their persecution continued. Her advocacy attracted the attention of Andrey Sakharov and an American senator, who helped her through the difficult process of emigrating from the Soviet Union. Before eventually being able to return to Crimea after a long political battle she met president Ronald Reagan and participated in many human rights conferences. Despite not supporting the Russian annexation of Crimea, she is currently highly critical of some of the actions of Mustafa Dzhemilev and his Mejilis faction.

References

Bibliography
 
 
 

1937 births
Crimean Tatar people
Crimean Tatar activists
Soviet dissidents
People from Bilohirsk Raion
Living people